Peter Germer (born 26 September 1949) is a German former wrestler who competed in the 1972 Summer Olympics.

References

External links
 

1949 births
Living people
Olympic wrestlers of East Germany
Wrestlers at the 1972 Summer Olympics
German male sport wrestlers